Kashin Glacier is the 8 km long and 2.7 km wide glacier on Fallières Coast in Graham Land, Antarctica. It is situated southwest of Perutz Glacier, north of Marvodol Glacier and east-southeast of Bader Glacier, flows northward between Shapkarev Buttress and Rudozem Heights, and flows into Bourgeois Fjord next southwest of Perutz Glacier.

The glacier is named after the settlement of Kashin in Northern Bulgaria.

Location
British mapping in 1978.

Maps
Antarctic Digital Database (ADD). Scale 1:250000 topographic map of Antarctica. Scientific Committee on Antarctic Research (SCAR). Since 1993, regularly upgraded and updated.
British Antarctic Territory. Scale 1:200000 topographic map. DOS 610 Series, Sheet W 67 66. Directorate of Overseas Surveys, Tolworth, UK, 1978.

References
 Bulgarian Antarctic Gazetteer. Antarctic Place-names Commission. (details in Bulgarian, basic data in English)
 Kashin Glacier. SCAR Composite Antarctic Gazetteer

External links
 Kashin Glacier. Copernix satellite image

Bulgaria and the Antarctic
Glaciers of Fallières Coast